Tavaras Hardy  is an American college basketball coach, and current head coach of the Loyola Greyhounds men's basketball team.

Playing career
Hardy was a two-time All-Big Ten selection while playing at Northwestern from 1998 to 2002 and ranks in the top 10 in blocks, games played, and games started for the Wildcats.

After graduation, Hardy played one season of professional basketball for Namika Lahti in Finland before returning to the United States to work in wealth management at JPMorgan Chase.

Coaching career
In 2007, Hardy returned to his alma mater to become an assistant coach under Bill Carmody, where he rose to the position of associate head coach in 2011. After Carmody was fired by Northwestern, Hardy remained on staff under Chris Collins for one season before moving on to Georgetown to work as an assistant under John Thompson III in 2013.

After three seasons with the Hoyas, Hardy joined Georgia Tech as an assistant coach under Josh Pastner. After two seasons with the Yellow Jackets, Hardy was named the 21st head men's basketball coach at Loyola (MD), succeeding G. G. Smith on March 28, 2018. His third campaign at Loyola ended with the Greyhounds advancing to its first Patriot League Championship Game in an 85–72 loss at Colgate on March 14, 2021 despite entering the tournament as the No. 9 seed.

Head coaching record

References

1980 births
Living people
American expatriate basketball people in Finland
American men's basketball coaches
American men's basketball players
Basketball coaches from Illinois
Basketball players from Illinois
Georgetown Hoyas men's basketball coaches
Georgia Tech Yellow Jackets men's basketball coaches
Loyola Greyhounds men's basketball coaches
Namika Lahti players
Northwestern Wildcats men's basketball coaches
Northwestern Wildcats men's basketball players
Sportspeople from Joliet, Illinois